Pansilu Deshan (born 18 November 1998) is a Sri Lankan cricketer. He made his Twenty20 debut on 7 March 2021, for Kalutara Town Club in the 2020–21 SLC Twenty20 Tournament.

References

External links
 

1998 births
Living people
Sri Lankan cricketers
Kalutara Town Club cricketers
Place of birth missing (living people)